Vincenzo Nicoli (born 27 July 1958) is a British actor who appears in film, television and theatre. He is best known for roles in blockbuster films, such as Alan Jude in the 1992 science fiction film Alien³ (1992), Enrico Biscaglia in the romantic drama film In Love and War (1996), Tony Genova in the 2016 short film The Naughty List (2016) and Auf Wiedersehen, Pet as Sandro.

He is also known for his role as Papa Pete in the CBBC children's programme Hank Zipzer (2014–2016) and as the voices of Lorenzo and Beppe in Thomas & Friends (2019–present). Along with actress Flaminia Cinque, he has appeared in Leap Year, The Knot, Brothers of Italy and Mama Cannelloni.

Early life
Nicoli was born in Worcester on 27 July 1958 to Italian parents originally from the region of Apulia.

He graduationed from a three-year acting course at the London Academy of Music and Dramatic Art (LAMDA), in London.

Career
He made his acting career when he appeared in the musical Bashville and as a minor character in Accidental Death of an Anarchist.

His television appearances include Rome, Dalziel and Pascoe, Dempsey and Makepeace, The Young Indiana Jones Chronicles, Auf Wiedersehen, Pet, Mr. Selfridge, EastEnders and Foyle's War.

Nicoli appeared as Antinous in the 1997 miniseries The Odyssey for two episodes of the miniseries. From 2014 to 2016, he played Papa Pete in the comedy programme Hank Zipzer with American actor and creator of the series Henry Winkler, who plays Mr. Rock, the music teacher of the title character.

He played a crime boss in the Christopher Nolan superhero film The Dark Knight, featuring Christian Bale, Heath Ledger, Gary Oldman, Michael Caine and Morgan Freeman. He has appeared in films such as Captain Phillips (featuring Tom Hanks, Barkhad Abdi and Catherine Keener), Leap Year, Alien³ (with Sigourney Weaver), Buster, In Love and War (featuring Sandra Bullock and Chris O'Donnell) and The Naughty List.

Nicoli played the role of Jono in the 2014 critically acclaimed short film The Double Deal, where Mark Holden produced and starred in after which Holden receives four awards.

In 2019, he joined the voice cast of Thomas & Friends as the voices of Lorenzo and Beppe in the UK & US versions, respectively.

In 2020, Nicoli appeared as the mobster known as Vincenzo Murgida in the Father Brown episode, "The Folly of Jephthah", which aired on 10 January 2020. Nicoli's character Vincenzo Murgida is considered the most notorious Italian mobster who wants Hercule Flambeau (John Light) to choose his fate.

Personal life
Nicoli is married to actress Heather Bleasdale. He has a daughter, Ella Nicoli-Horne, from a previous relationship who studies at Bournemouth University. He speaks English and Italian. He upholds his British-Italian citizenship.

Filmography

Film

Television

Video games

Stage

Radio

References

External links
 
 
 

1958 births
English male film actors
English male television actors
English male stage actors
English male voice actors
English people of Italian descent
People of Apulian descent
20th-century English male actors
21st-century English male actors
Alumni of the London Academy of Music and Dramatic Art
Actors from Worcester, England
Living people